Ben Caldecott is a British environmentalist and expert in sustainable finance who is the founding director of the Oxford Sustainable Finance Programme at the University of Oxford Smith School of Enterprise and the Environment. At the University of Oxford, he is the inaugural Lombard Odier Associate Professor and Senior Research Fellow of Sustainable Finance, the first ever endowed professorship of sustainable finance, and a Supernumerary Fellow at Oriel College. Caldecott is also the founding director and principal investigator of the UK Centre for Greening Finance & Investment (CGFI), established by UK Research and Innovation in 2021 as the national centre to accelerate the adoption and use of climate and environmental data and analytics by financial institutions internationally. Since 2019, he has also been seconded to the UK Cabinet Office as the COP26 Strategy Advisor for Finance. He is a Trustee of the Green Alliance.

Biography 

Ben Caldecott has been recognised as "a leading thinker of the green movement" by The Independent and has written for The Guardian, The Independent, The Telegraph and The Huffington Post. He has been a commentator for a number of national news outlets, including the BBC, CNBC, The Financial Times, The New York Times and The Wall Street Journal. Caldecott has authored, co-authored and edited publications on energy, climate change and sustainability, including with Bill Bryson and Dieter Helm.

Prior to joining the Smith School of Enterprise and the Environment, Caldecott was head of policy at investment bank Climate Change Capital and before that was research director of environment and energy at Policy Exchange.

Caldecott read economics and specialised in development and China at the University of Cambridge, SOAS University of London and Peking University. He has a doctorate in economic geography from the University of Oxford.

He was first included in the 2013 edition of Who's Who (UK) and in that edition was the youngest non-sportsperson included on merit (i.e. not entered automatically through the possession of a hereditary title).

He is a member of the board of the Conservative Environment Network (CEN), an independent forum for conservatives who support conservation and decarbonisation.

Caldecott is co-chairman of The Global Research Alliance for Sustainable Finance and Investment (GRASFI), together with Professor Rob Bauer (Maastricht University). Founded in 2017 by a network of global research universities, the Alliance aims to promote rigorous and highly impactful academic research on sustainable finance and investment. The Alliance is composed of 25 members.

In August 2019, Caldecott was appointed as senior advisor to chair and CEO of the Green Finance Institute, an independent forum for public and private collaboration on green finance with a mission to accelerate the UK's transition to a net-zero carbon economy.

In 2020, Caldecott was created the "Lombard Odier Associate Professor and Senior Research Fellow of Sustainable Finance" at Oxford University

References 

British environmentalists
Living people
Year of birth missing (living people)